Secrets of the Stars is the third serial of the second series of the British science fiction television series The Sarah Jane Adventures. It first aired in two weekly parts on the CBBC channel on 20 and 27 October 2008.

Plot
The Ancient Lights, entities that existed before the Big Bang and controlled life through astrology, possess their chosen one, the astrologer Martin Trueman, and gives him the ability to channel the power of the stars. Later, Sarah Jane, Luke, Clyde, and Rani are visiting a stage show hosted by Trueman. Trueman gives three dates and forces people born on those dates, including Clyde, to stand up and sit down. He also accurately tells the horoscopes of several of the audience members, before predicting Sarah Jane's downfall.

Trueman forces Clyde to become his slave to stop Sarah Jane, but Luke, who has no birthday or astrological sign as he was artificially activated, breaks Clyde's connection to Trueman, saving her. Pretending to still be possessed and one of Trueman's inner circle, Clyde bluffs his way into the theatre with his friends. At the theatre, Trueman begins taking over each astrological sign of the zodiac one at a time with the help of a worldwide broadcast instructing people to submit to the Ancient Lights. As part of a perfect conjunction of every star they have been awaiting for 13 billion years, the Ancient Lights create a portal through to the theatre. Luke breaks the connection in Trueman's inner circle that is summoning the Ancient Lights the same way he did with Clyde. Realising that he has been beaten, Trueman cannot bear to return to his former life and instead chooses to become one with the stars, disappearing in a trail of golden dust.

Production
Russ Abbot enjoyed his part as the villain, as it was different from other roles he had played.

Broadcast and reception

References

External links

The official BBC The Sarah Jane Adventures website
Press Pack information regarding Secrets of the Stars at the BBC Press Office website

The Sarah Jane Adventures episodes
Films with screenplays by Gareth Roberts (writer)
2008 British television episodes